Strotarchus is a genus of araneomorph spiders in the family Cheiracanthiidae that was first described by Eugène Louis Simon in 1888. Originally added to the Clubionidae, it was moved to the Miturgidae in 1967, and to the Cheiracanthiidae in 2014. It is considered a senior synonym of Marcellina and Coreidon.

Species
 it contains twenty species, found in South America, Mexico, the United States, Costa Rica, and Pakistan:
Strotarchus alboater Dyal, 1935 – Pakistan
Strotarchus beepbeep Bonaldo, Saturnino, Ramírez & Brescovit, 2012 – USA
Strotarchus bolero Bonaldo, Saturnino, Ramírez & Brescovit, 2012 – Mexico
Strotarchus gandu Bonaldo, Saturnino, Ramírez & Brescovit, 2012 – Brazil
Strotarchus jacala Bonaldo, Saturnino, Ramírez & Brescovit, 2012 – Mexico
Strotarchus mazamitla Bonaldo, Saturnino, Ramírez & Brescovit, 2012 – Mexico
Strotarchus michoacan Bonaldo, Saturnino, Ramírez & Brescovit, 2012 – Mexico
Strotarchus minor Banks, 1909 – Costa Rica
Strotarchus monasticus Bonaldo, Saturnino, Ramírez & Brescovit, 2012 – Mexico
Strotarchus nebulosus Simon, 1888 (type) – Mexico
Strotarchus piscatorius (Hentz, 1847) – USA, Mexico
Strotarchus planeticus Edwards, 1958 – USA, Mexico
Strotarchus praedator (O. Pickard-Cambridge, 1898) – Mexico
Strotarchus silvae Bonaldo, Saturnino, Ramírez & Brescovit, 2012 – Peru
Strotarchus tamaulipas Bonaldo, Saturnino, Ramírez & Brescovit, 2012 – Mexico
Strotarchus tlaloc Bonaldo, Saturnino, Ramírez & Brescovit, 2012 – Mexico
Strotarchus tropicus (Mello-Leitão, 1917) – Brazil
Strotarchus urarina Bonaldo, Saturnino, Ramírez & Brescovit, 2012 – Peru
Strotarchus violaceus F. O. Pickard-Cambridge, 1899 – Mexico
Strotarchus vittatus Dyal, 1935 – Pakistan

References

Araneomorphae genera
Cheiracanthiidae
Spiders of Asia
Spiders of North America
Spiders of South America